Fathabad-e Sofla (also Romanized as Fatḩābād-e Soflá) is a village in Kuh Mareh Sorkhi Rural District, Arzhan District, Shiraz County, Fars Province, Iran. At the 2006 census, its population was 208, in 44 families.

References 

Populated places in Shiraz County